The Old Engine Company No. 6 at 438 Massachusetts Ave in Washington, DC is a former District of Columbia Fire Department building which housed Engine 6 between February 17, 1879, and June 27, 1974.  The two-story brick building was built during the volunteer period and is the only remaining example from that time.

In 2012, the location was reopened as a restaurant.

References

External links

Fire stations completed in 1862
Fire stations on the National Register of Historic Places in Washington, D.C.
Italianate architecture in Washington, D.C.
1862 establishments in Washington, D.C.